Serbian artists may refer to:

 Artists from Serbia, artists who are from Serbia
 Serbs artists, artists who are ethnic Serbs

See also 
 Serbian (disambiguation)
 Singer (disambiguation)